The Emde degradation (also called Emde-reaction or Emde-reduction) is a method for the reduction of a quaternary ammonium cation to a tertiary amine with sodium amalgam:

This organic reaction was first described in 1909 by the German chemist Hermann Emde and was for a long time of great importance in structure elucidation of many alkaloids, for example that of ephedrine.

Alternative reducing agents exist for this reaction; for instance, lithium aluminium hydride.

See also 
 Related reactions are the Hofmann elimination and the von Braun reaction

References

Organic redox reactions
Name reactions
Degradation reactions